Gallant Lady may refer to:

 Gallant Lady (1934 film)
 Gallant Lady (1942 film)
 Gallant Lady (yacht)